Madsen is a common surname of Danish origin. The meaning of Madsen is Son of Mads. "Mads" is Danish form of Matthew. Madsen is used rarely as a first name.

Notable people with the surname include:
Alexander Madsen, Finnish basketball player
Angela Madsen, American rower and athlete
Arch L. Madsen, American radio and television pioneer 
Barbara Madsen, American judge
Birger Madsen, Norwegian football player
Bo Madsen, guitarist of the Danish rock band Mew
Charles D. Madsen, American politician
Chris Madsen, Danish-American lawman
Christian Madsen, American actor
Claus Madsen, Danish football player
Eric Madsen, American college baseball coach
Erik Madsen (chess player), Norwegian chess player
Gerda Madsen, Danish film actress
Gitte Madsen, Danish handball player
Gordon A. Madsen, American state legislator in Utah
Gunnar Madsen, American vocalist
Henrik O. Madsen, Danish businessperson and engineer
Jakob Broechner Madsen, Danish economist
Janne Madsen, Danish football player
Jeff Madsen, American poker player
John Madsen (American football), American football player
John M. Madsen, American leader in The Church of Jesus Christ of Latter-day Saints
Katrine Madsen, Danish jazz singer
Kenneth C. Madsen, American artist
Kim André Madsen, Norwegian football player
Kristian Madsen, Danish gymnast
Lars Jørgen Madsen, Danish rifle shooter
Lars Møller Madsen, Danish team handball player
Mads Lauritz Madsen, Norwegian politician
Mark Madsen (basketball), American basketball player
Mathew Madsen, New Zealand weightlifter
Mette Madsen (1924–2015), Danish politician and writer
Michael Madsen (disambiguation), several people
Michael Madsen (footballer), Danish football player
Nicolaj Madsen, Danish football player
Ole Madsen, Danish football player
Ole Christian Madsen, Danish film director and writer
Peter Madsen (disambiguation), several people
Phil Madsen, New Zealand singer/songwriter
Robert Madsen, Danish gymnast
Ricardt Madsen, Danish boxer
Sigfred Madsen, Danish boxer
Spencer Madsen, American poet
Stephan Tschudi-Madsen, Norwegian art historian
Susanne Madsen, Danish handball player
Svend Madsen, Danish gymnast
Truman G. Madsen, Latter-Day Saint author
Tue Madsen, Danish music producer and sound engineer
Wayne Madsen (journalist), American author
Vibeke Hammer Madsen, Norwegian businessperson
Vilhelm Herman Oluf Madsen, Danish politician, minister, businessman and inventor
Vigo Madsen, Danish gymnast
Virginia Madsen, American actress

People with the first name Madsen include:
 Madsen Mompremier
 Madsen Pirie

Danish-language surnames
Patronymic surnames
Surnames from given names